Vittorio Gassman  (born Gassmann; 1 September 1922 – 29 June 2000), popularly known as , was an Italian actor, director and screenwriter.

He is considered one of the greatest Italian actors, whose career includes both important productions as well as dozens of divertissements.

Biography

Early life
Gassmann was born in Genoa to a German father, Heinrich Gassmann (an engineer from Karlsruhe), and an Italian Jewish mother, Luisa Ambron, born in Pisa. While still very young, he moved to Rome, where he studied at the Silvio D'Amico National Academy of Dramatic Arts.

Career
Gassman's debut was in Milan, in 1942, with Alda Borelli in Niccodemi's La Nemica (theatre). He then moved to Rome and acted at the Teatro Eliseo joining Tino Carraro and Ernesto Calindri in a team that remained famous for some time; with them he acted in a range of plays from bourgeois comedy to sophisticated intellectual theatre. In 1946, he made his film debut in Preludio d'amore, while only one year later he appeared in five films. In 1948 he played in Riso amaro.

It was with Luchino Visconti's company that Gassman achieved his mature successes, together with Paolo Stoppa, Rina Morelli and Paola Borboni. He played Stanley Kowalski in Tennessee Williams' Un tram che si chiama desiderio (A Streetcar Named Desire), as well as in Come vi piace (As You Like It) by Shakespeare and Oreste (by Vittorio Alfieri). He joined the Teatro Nazionale with Tommaso Salvini, Massimo Girotti, Arnoldo Foà to create a successful Peer Gynt (by Henrik Ibsen). With Luigi Squarzina in 1952 he co-founded and co-directed the Teatro d'Arte Italiano, producing the first complete version of Hamlet in Italy, followed by rare works such as Seneca's Thyestes and Aeschylus's The Persians.

In 1956 Gassman played the title role in a production of Othello. He was so well received by his acting in the television series entitled  that "Il Mattatore" became the nickname that accompanied him for the rest of his life. Gassman's debut in the commedia all'italiana genre was rather accidental, in Mario Monicelli's I soliti ignoti (Big Deal on Madonna Street, 1958). Famous movies featuring Gassman include: Il sorpasso (1962), La Grande Guerra (1962), I mostri (1963), L'Armata Brancaleone (1966), Profumo di donna (1974) and C'eravamo tanto amati (1974).

He directed Adelchi, a lesser-known work by Alessandro Manzoni. Gassman brought this production to half a million spectators, crossing Italy with his Teatro Popolare Itinerante (a newer edition of the famous Carro di Tespi). His productions have included many of the famous authors and playwrights of the 20th century, with repeated returns to the classics of Shakespeare, Dostoyevsky and the Greek tragicians. He also founded a theatre school in Florence (Bottega Teatrale di Firenze), which educated many of the more talented actors of the current generation of Italian thespians.

In cinema, he worked frequently both in Italy and abroad. He met and fell in love with American actress Shelley Winters while she was touring Europe with fiancé Farley Granger. When Winters was forced to return to Hollywood to fulfill contractual obligations, he followed her there and married her. With his natural charisma and his fluency in English he scored a number of roles in Hollywood, including Rhapsody with Elizabeth Taylor and The Glass Wall before returning to Italy and the theatre.

In the 1990s he took part in the popular Italian Rai 3 TV show Tunnel in which he very formally and "seriously"' recited documents such as utility bills, yellow pages and similar trivial texts, such as washing instructions for a wool sweater or cookies ingredients. He rendered them with the same professional skill that made him famous while reciting Dante's Divine Comedy.

In 1994, Gassman voiced Mufasa in the Italian dubbed version of The Lion King. Gassman's voice was redubbed in several of his films by historical Italian actors and dubbers which include Emilio Cigoli, Sandro Ruffini, Gualtiero De Angelis, Stefano Sibaldi, Enrico Maria Salerno and Pino Locchi.

Personal life
Gassman married three times, all to actresses: Nora Ricci (with whom he had Paola, an actress and wife of Ugo Pagliai); Shelley Winters (mother of his daughter Vittoria); and Diletta D'Andrea (mother of his son Jacopo).

While rehearsing Hamlet, he began an affair with Anna Maria Ferrero, his 16-year-old Ophelia, which ended his marriage to Winters. He and Winters were forced to work together on Mambo just as their marriage was unraveling, providing fodder for tabloids all over the world.

From 1964 to 1968 he was the partner of French actress Juliette Mayniel (mother of his son Alessandro, also an actor). Through Alessandro, he is the grandfather of singer-songwriter Leo Gassmann.

On 29 June 2000, Gassman died of a heart attack in his sleep at his home in Rome at the age of 77. He was buried at Campo Verano.

Gassman suffered from bipolar disorder.

Filmography

Actor

Incontro con Laura (1945)
The Captain's Daughter (1947) as Svabrin
Preludio d'amore (Love Prelude, 1947) as Davide
Le avventure di Pinocchio (The Adventures of Pinocchio, 1947) as The Green Fisherman
Daniele Cortis (1947) as Daniele Cortis
L'ebreo errante  (The Wandering Jew, 1948) as Mathieu Nahum / Mathieu Blumenthal
Il cavaliere misterioso (The Mysterious Rider, 1948) as Giacomo Casanova, cavaliere di Seingalt
Riso amaro (Bitter Rice, 1949) as Walter
Una voce nel tuo cuore (1949) as Paolo Baldini
The Wolf of the Sila (1949) as Pietro Campolo
Ho sognato il paradiso (Streets of Sorrow, 1950) as Giorgio
I fuorilegge, (The Outlaws, 1950) as Turi
Lo sparviero del Nilo (Hawk of the Nile, 1950) as Yussuf
Il leone di Amalfi (The Lion of Amalfi, 1950) as Mauro
Il tradimento (Double Cross, 1951) as Renato Salvi
La corona negra (1951) as Mauricio
Anna (1951) as Vittorio
The Dream of Zorro (1952) as Don Antonio / Juan
Girls Marked Danger (1952) as Michele
The Glass Wall (1953) as Peter Kaban
Sombrero (1953) as Alejandro Castillo
Cry of the Hunted (1953) as Jory
Rhapsody (1954) as Paul Bronte
Mambo (1954) as Mario Rossi
La donna più bella del mondo (1955) as Prince Sergei
The Violent Patriot (1956) as Giovanni de Medici dalle Bande Nere
War and Peace (1956) as Anatol Kuragin
Difendo il mio amore (1956) as Giovanni Marchi
Kean: Genius or Scoundrel (1957) as Edmund Kean
I soliti ignoti (Big Deal on Madonna Street, 1958) as Peppe il pantera
La ragazza del palio (1958) as Piero di Montalcino
La tempesta (1958) as Prosecutor
The Great War (1959) as Giovanni Busacca
The Miracle (1959) as Guido
La cambiale (1959) as Michele
Le sorprese dell'amore (1959) as The Schoolteacher (uncredited)
Audace colpo dei soliti ignoti (Hold-up à la milanaise, 1959) as Peppe er pantera
Il Mattatore (1960) as Gerardo Latini
Crimen (Killing in Monte Carlo, 1960) as Remo Capretti
Fantasmi a Roma (Ghosts of Rome, 1961) as Giovanni Battista Villari, aka 'il Caparra'
A Difficult Life (1961) as himself (uncredited)
The Last Judgement (1961) as Cimino
I briganti italiani (1961) as O Caporale
Barabbas (1961) as Sahak
Anima nera (1962) as Adriano Zucchelli
Il giorno più corto (1962)
Il Sorpasso (The Easy Life, 1962) as Bruno Cortona
La Marcia su Roma (March on Rome, 1962) as Domenico Rocchetti
L'amore difficile (Sex Can Be Difficult, 1962) as L'avvocato (segment "L'avaro")
La Smania addosso (1963) as Giorgio Mazzanò - lawyer
Il Successo (1963) as Giulio Ceriani
I Mostri (1963) as The Actor (segment "La Raccomandazione") / Policeman (segment "Il Mostro") / Production Assistant & Movie Director (segment "Presa dalla Vita") / Nicola (segment "Che Vitaccia!") / Blonde Latin Lover (segment "Latin Lovers-Amanti latini") / Defence Layer D'Amore (segment "Testimone volontario") / Richetto (segment "I due Orfanelli") / Roberto (segment "Il Sacrificato") / Elisa (segment "La Musa") / The Road Hog (segment "La Strada è di Tutti") / The Friar (segment "Il Testamento di Francesco") / Artemio Altidori (segment "La nobile Arte")
Frenesia dell'estate (1964) as Captain Mario Nardoni
Se permettete parliamo di donne (Let's Talk About Women, 1964) as Stranger / Practical Joker / Client / Lover / Impatient Lover / Waiter / Timid Brother / Ragman / Prisoner
Il Gaucho (1964) as Marco Ravicchio
La Congiuntura (Hard Time for Princes, 1965) as Giuliano
The Dirty Game (1965) as Perego / Ferrari (French)
Slalom (1965) as Lucio Ridolfi
Una Vergine per il Principe (Virgin for the Prince, 1966) as Principe don vincenzo gonzaga
L'Armata Brancaleone (1966) as Brancaleone da Norcia
Le piacevoli notti (1966) as Bastiano da Sangallo
The Devil in Love (L'arcidiavolo, 1966) as Belfagor
Il Tigre (1967) as Francesco Vincenzini
Sette Volte Donna (Woman Times Seven, 1967) as Cenci (segment "Two Against One")
Questi fantasmi (Ghosts – Italian Style, 1968) as Pasquale Lojacono
Lo scatenato (1968) as Bob Chiaramonte
Il Profeta (1968) as Pietro Breccia
La pecora nera (The Black Sheep, 1968) as Mario Agasti / Filippo Agasti
L'Alibi (Alibi, 1969) as Vittorio
Dove vai tutta nuda? (Where Are You Going All Naked?, 1969) as Rufus Conforti
Una su 13 (The 13 Chairs, 1969) as Mario Beretti
L'Arcangelo (1969) as Furio Bertuccia
Contestazione generale (1970) as Riccardo
The Divorce (1970) as Leonardo Nenci
Brancaleone alle Crociate (Brancaleone at the Crusades, 1970) as Brancaleone da Norcia
Scipione detto anche l'africano (Scipio the African, 1971) as Catone il Censore
In nome del popolo italiano (1971) as Lorenzo Santenocito
Senza famiglia, nullatenenti cercano affetto (1972) as Armando Zavanatti
L'udienza (The Audience, 1972) as Principe Donati
Che c'entriamo noi con la rivoluzione? (1972) as Guido Guidi
La Tosca (1973) as Scarpia
Profumo di donna (Scent of a Woman, 1974) as Il capitano Fausto Consolo
C'eravamo tanto amati (We All Loved Each Other So Much, 1974) as Gianni Perego
A mezzanotte va la ronda del piacere (Midnight Pleasures, 1975) as Andrea Sansoni
Telefoni bianchi (1976) as Franco Denza
Come una rosa al naso (Pure as a Lily, 1976) as Anthony M. Wilson
Signore e signori, buonanotte (1976) as CIA agent / Tuttumpezzo
The Desert of the Tartars (The Desert of the Tartars, 1976) as Colonel Giovanbattista Filimore
Anima persa (The Forbidden Room, 1977) as Fabio Stolz
I nuovi mostri (Via l'Italia!, 1977) as Il cardinale (segment "Tantum ergo") / Il cameriere (segment "Hostaria") / Il marito (segment "Sequestro di persona cara") / Il commissario (segment "Il sospetto") / Il padre di famiglia (segment "Cittadino esemplare")
A Wedding (1978) as Luigi Corelli
Quintet (1979) as St. Christopher
Caro papà (Dear Father, 1979) as Albino Millozza
Due pezzi di pane (Happy Hobos, 1979) as Pippo Mifà
Sono fotogenico (1980) as himself (uncredited)
La terrazza (The Terrace, 1980) as Mario
The Nude Bomb (1980) as Sauvage / Nino Salvatori Sebastiani
Camera d'albergo (Chambre d'hôtel, 1981) as Achille Mengaroni
Il Turno (1981) as Ciro Coppa
Sharky's Machine (1981) as Albert Scarelli / Victor D'Anton
Di padre in figlio (1982) as himself
Tempest (1982) as Alonzo
Il Conte Tacchia (Count Tacchia, 1982) as Prince Torquato Terenzi
La Vie est un roman (Life Is a Bed of Roses, 1983) as Walter Guarini
Benvenuta (1983) as Livio Carpi
Paradigma (Power of Evil, 1985) as Gottfried
I Soliti ignoti vent'anni dopo (Big Deal After 20 Years, 1985) as Peppe il pantera
La Famiglia (The Family, 1987) as Carlo, as a man / Carlo's grandfather
I Picari (1987) as Marchese Felipe de Aragona
Mortacci (1989) as Domenico
Lo zio indegno (1989) as Uncle Luca
Dimenticare Palermo (1990) as Il Principe
Tolgo il disturbo (1990) as Augusto Scribani
Les 1001 Nuits (1990) as Sinbad
I Divertimenti della vita privata (The Amusements of Private Life, 1990) as Marquis
Rossini! Rossini! (1991) as Ludwig van Beethoven (uncredited)
El Largo invierno (1992) as Claudio
When We Were Repressed (1992) as The Sexologist
Abraham (1993, TV series) as Terah
Tutti gli anni una volta l'anno (1994) as Giuseppe
Sleepers (1996) as Benny 'King Benny'
Deserto di fuoco (1997, TV Series) as Tarek
Un homme digne de confiance (1997) as Adriano Venturi
La cena (1998) as Maestro Pezzullo
La bomba (1999) as Don Vito Bracalone
Luchino Visconti (1999) as himself

Director
Kean (1956)
L'Alibi (1969)
Senza famiglia, nullatenenti cercano affetto (1972)
Di padre in figlio (1982)

Dubbing roles

Animation
Mufasa in The Lion King (1994), dubbing James Earl Jones

Live action
Narrator in Romeo and Juliet (1968), dubbing Laurence Olivier

Writer 
Luca de' Numeri. Novel, in 1947 won the Fogazzaro prize, published in 1965 (ed. Lerici)
Un grande avvenire dietro le spalle. Milan, (1981). Longanesi & C.
 Vocalizzi. Milan, (1988). Longanesi & C.
 Memorie del sottoscala. Milan, (1990). Longanesi & C.

Audiobooks 
CL 0426 – Antologia moderna – Ungaretti, Cardarelli, Palazzeschi, Montale, Quasimodo.
CL 0401 – Dante Alighieri – Inferno canto quinto.
CL 0437 – Dante Alighieri – Inferno canto XXVI.
CL 0402 – Dante Alighieri – Paradiso canto XXXIII.
CL 0457 – Elogio Olimpico – Poesie sportive.
CL 0459 – Eschilo – Coefore – with Valentina Fortunato and Maria Fabbri.
CL 0438 – Foscolo – Sepolcri.
CL 0439 – Leopardi – Poesie
CL 0440 – Leopardi – Poesie.
CL 0458 – Manzoni – Adelchi, with Carlo D'Angelo.
CL 0414 – Manzoni – Promessi sposi.
CL 0416 – Manzoni – Il cinque maggio.
CL 0441 – Mistici del '200.
CL 0470 – Pascarella – Sonetti.
CL 0417 – Pascoli – Poesie.
CL 0420 – Saba – Poesie.
CL 0415 – Shakespeare – Amleto.
CL 0427 – Sonetti attraverso i secoli.
CL 0443 – Gassman nel Mattatore prose varie.
CL 0444 – Gassman nel Mattatore prose varie.
CLV 0604 – Shakespeare – Otello.
CLV 0607 – Irma la dolce.
CLV 0609 – Gassman – Il Mattatore prose varie.

References

External links

 
 
 
 

1922 births
2000 deaths
Italian film directors
Italian male film actors
Italian male stage actors
Italian male screenwriters
Italian people of German descent
Italian people of Jewish descent
20th-century Italian Jews
Jewish male actors
Actors from Genoa
Film people from Genoa
Male Spaghetti Western actors
Accademia Nazionale di Arte Drammatica Silvio D'Amico alumni
Cannes Film Festival Award for Best Actor winners
David di Donatello winners
Nastro d'Argento winners
David di Donatello Career Award winners
Ciak d'oro winners
20th-century Italian male actors
People with bipolar disorder
Burials at Campo Verano
20th-century Italian screenwriters
20th-century Italian male writers